Xi Aihua (born 27 January 1982 in Shouguang, Shandong) is a female Chinese rower, who competed for Team China at the 2008 Summer Olympics.

Major performances
2001/2005 National Games – 2nd eights/single sculls;
2002 National Championships – 1st double/quadruple sculls;
2006/2007 World Cup Poznan/Amsterdam – 2nd/1st quadruple sculls;
2006/2007 World Championships – 4th/3rd quadruple sculls

References

1982 births
Living people
Olympic gold medalists for China
Olympic rowers of China
People from Weifang
Rowers at the 2008 Summer Olympics
Olympic medalists in rowing
Chinese female rowers
Rowers from Shandong
Medalists at the 2008 Summer Olympics
World Rowing Championships medalists for China
20th-century Chinese women
21st-century Chinese women